Escapement (aka The Electronic Monster ) is a 1958 British horror science fiction film directed by Montgomery Tully and David Paltenghi (dream sequences) .

Plot
Inquiring into the mysterious death of a Hollywood star, insurance investigator Jeff Keenan uncovers an exclusive psychiatric clinic on the French Riviera. Here, patients who want to escape the stresses of life are hypnotized, then laid out in morgue-like drawers and left to dream for several weeks. It turns out that Dr. Zakon, the clinic's ex-Nazi owner, is using  a "dream machine" to alter the sleepers' dreams, and to impose his will on theirs.

Cast
 Rod Cameron as Jeff Keenan
 Mary Murphy as Ruth Vance
 Meredith Edwards as Dr. Philip Maxwell
 Peter Illing as Paul Zakon
 Carl Jaffe as Dr. Hoff (as Carl Jaffé)
 Kay Callard as Laura Maxwell
 Carl Duering as Blore
 Roberta Huby as Verna Berteaux
 Felix Felton as Police Commissaire
 Larry Cross as Brad Somers
 Carlo Borelli as Signore Pietro Kallini
 John McCarthy as Claude Denver
 Jacques Cey as Police Doctor
 Armand Guinle as French Farmer (as Armande Guinle)
 Malou Pantera as Clinic Receptionist
 Pat Clavin as Receptionist at Studio 
 Alan Gifford as Wayne - Insurance Company Chief

Production
Producer Richard Gordon later said there were major problems with the film's special effects. He also said that he had a dispute with Anglo-Amalgamated, who did not want the movie to get an X certificate in England, whereas Gordon wanted more horror for the US.

Critical reception
Leonard Maltin called it a "blah sci-fi programmer" ; while TV Guide noted, "an intriguing feature in that it was among the first to examine the possibilities of psychological manipulation and brainwashing."  Moria found that the movie failed to live up to its interesting premise, being overly talky. The Encyclopedia of Science Fiction found the movie was leaning towards a thriller-like plot and had a disinclination to argue too about its often shaky scientific pinning.

References

External links
 
 

1958 films
Films directed by Montgomery Tully
Fiction about mind control
British science fiction films
1950s science fiction films
1950s English-language films
1950s British films